Manasé Bezara (born September 23, 1959 in Anosibe Moramanga) is a Malagasy politician. He is a member of the Senate of Madagascar for Antsinanana, and is a member of the Tiako I Madagasikara party.

External links
Official page on the Senate website 

1959 births
Living people
Members of the Senate (Madagascar)
Tiako I Madagasikara politicians